Tim Wendel (born 12 January 1989) is a German footballer who plays as a centre-back for Wuppertaler SV.

References

External links
 

Living people
1989 births
People from Moers
Sportspeople from Düsseldorf (region)
German footballers
Association football defenders
3. Liga players
FC Schalke 04 II players
1. FC Kaiserslautern II players
Hannover 96 II players
Sportfreunde Lotte players
TSV Havelse players
Footballers from North Rhine-Westphalia